Black as Pitch is the fourth studio album of the Italian extreme metal band Necrodeath.

Track listing
All tracks by Necrodeath

 "Red as Blood" - 3:57
 "Riot of Stars" - 2:46
 "Burn and Deny" - 2:55
 "Mortal Consequence" - 2:55
 "Sacrifice 2K1" - 3:34
 "Process of Violation" - 3:19
 "Anagaton" - 2:43
 "Killing Time" - 2:19
 "Saviors of Hate" - 3:24
 "Join the Pain" - 2:48
 "Church's Black Book" - 8:07

Credits
Flegias: Vocals
Peso: Drums
Claudio: Guitars
John: Bass

References

2001 albums
Necrodeath albums
Scarlet Records albums